Nang Rong is a district (amphoe) of Buriram province, northeastern Thailand. The district lies approximately 50 km south-southwest of Buriram City.

Geography
Neighboring districts are (from the northeast clockwise) Chamni, Mueang Buriram, Prakhon Chai, Chaloem Phra Kiat, Lahan Sai, Pakham, Non Suwan, and Nong Ki of Buriram Province.

It is the closest town to the Phanom Rung Historical Park, and 11th century religious site.

Motto
The Nang Rong District's motto is "The ancient city, coconut and sugar, city pillar shrine, Progressive economy, delicious boiled pork leg and Nang Rong language."

Climate

Administration
The district is divided into 15 sub-districts (tambons), which are further subdivided into 204 villages (mubans). Nang Rong is a township (thesaban tambon) which covers parts of tambon Nang Rong and Thanon Hak. There are also 15 tambon administrative organizations (TAO).

Missing numbers are tambon which now form the districts Non Suwan and Chamni, as well as parts of Chaloem Phra Kiat.

References

Nang Rong